Anders Aukland (born 12 September 1972 in Tønsberg) is a professional Norwegian cross-country skier who has won both Olympic and World Championship gold medals. He lives in Oslo.

Aukland also used to compete in athletics, and is a former national champion in 5000 meters (1995) and 10,000 metres (1996 and 1997) as well as cross-country running. He has represented Tønsberg FIK and IK Tjalve. In his only international athletics competition he finished seventh in 5000 m at the 1991 European Junior Championships.

Aukland received the Egebergs Ærespris in 2001.

On 7 March 2004, Aukland won the Vasaloppet in Sweden, becoming the second Norwegian to accomplish this feat after 1971 winner Ole Ellefsæter. Aukland's brother Jørgen finished 3rd in that event. In 2010 Anders won the 54 km Birkebeinerrennet. In 2008 he won Marcialonga.

He has his education from the Norwegian School of Sport Sciences.

Cross-country skiing results
All results are sourced from the International Ski Federation (FIS).

Olympic Games
 1 medal – (1 gold)

World Championships
 3 medals – (1 gold, 2 silver)

World Cup

Season standings

Individual podiums
 6 victories (6 ) 
 13 podiums (13 )

Team podiums
 4 victories – (4 ) 
 5 podiums – (5 )

References

External links
 

1972 births
Cross-country skiers at the 2002 Winter Olympics
Cross-country skiers at the 2006 Winter Olympics
Living people
Norwegian male middle-distance runners
Norwegian male cross-country skiers
Norwegian School of Sport Sciences alumni
Olympic cross-country skiers of Norway
Olympic gold medalists for Norway
Sportspeople from Tønsberg
Anders
Vasaloppet winners
Olympic medalists in cross-country skiing
FIS Nordic World Ski Championships medalists in cross-country skiing
Medalists at the 2002 Winter Olympics